Unione Sportiva Ausonia Spezia was an Italian association football club located in La Spezia.

The club was admitted to the 1945–46 Serie B-C after merging with the Afterwork Spezia, the second club in the city. However, the following season Ausonia was relegated to Serie C 1946–47. The club was immediately relegated to Promozione and later dissolved.

See also
Spezia Calcio
1945–46 Serie B-C Alta Italia
Serie C 1946–47

References

External links
Spezia Calcio Italian wiki article
DALLE STELLE ALLE STALLE – Storia dello Spezia f.b.c. dal 1945 al 1962

Defunct football clubs in Italy